The Pureo7-200 class (푸러7-200) was a class consisting of steam tank locomotives with 2-6-2 wheel arrangement operated by the Korean National Railroad in South Korea. The "Pureo" name came from the American naming system for steam locomotives, under which locomotives with 2-6-2 wheel arrangement were called "Prairie".

In all, the Chosen Government Railway owned 227 locomotives of all Pure classes, whilst privately owned railways owned another 52 - including these; of these 279 locomotives, 169 went to the Korean National Railroad in South Korea and 110 to the Korean State Railway in North Korea. 

The Chosen Gyeongnam Railway, a privately owned railway in the southwestern part of colonial-era Korea, received at least eleven 2-6-2T tank locomotive built by H.K. Porter, Inc. of the United States in 1921, which it numbered 201 through at least 211. After the Liberation and partition of Korea, all railways in South Korea were nationalised, and these locomotives were taken up by the new Korean National Railroad, which designated the class 푸러7-200 (Pureo7-200) class and numbered the locomotives 푸러7-201 though at least 푸러7-211.

References

Locomotives of Korea
Locomotives of South Korea
Railway locomotives introduced in 1921
2-6-2 locomotives
H. K. Porter locomotives